WH Hill (full name unknown) was an English first-class cricketer who played two games for Worcestershire in 1900.

Hill's debut, against Lancashire at Old Trafford, was the game in which Johnny Briggs took all ten Worcestershire wickets for 55 runs.

Notes

References
 
 

Year of birth missing
Year of death missing
English cricketers
Worcestershire cricketers